Cescau may refer to:

 Cescau, Ariège, a commune in the Ariège department, France
 Cescau, Pyrénées-Atlantiques, a commune in the Pyrénées-Atlantiques department, France
 Patrick Cescau (born 1948), London-based French businessman

See also
 Cesca, a surname